Tha Tan is a sub-district (tambon) in the Bang Krathum District of Phitsanulok Province, Thailand.

Geography
Tha Tan is the northernmost sub-district in Bang Krathum, bordering Wang Nam Khu of Mueang Phitsanulok District to the north-west, Wang Thong District  to the north-east, Nakhon Pa Mak to the south and Bang Krathum to the south-west.

Tha Tan lies in the Nan Basin, which is part of the Chao Phraya Watershed. The Wang Thong River flows through the sub-district.

History
Originally named Bang Phi (บางผี), it was renamed Tha Tan in 1939.

Administration
The sub-district is divided into nine smaller divisions (mubans), (villages).  Tha Tan is administered by a tambon administrative organization (TAO).  The muban in Tha Tan are enumerated as follows:

Temples
Tha Tan is home to the following eight temples:
Wat Pak Khlong (Thai:  วัดปากคลอง, Temple of the Mouth of the Canal) in Ban Tha Dindaeng
Wat Tha Tan (Thai:  วัดท่าตาล) in Ban Tha Tan
Wat Tan Phlong (Thai:  วัดตาลโพลง, Bright Sugar-Palm Temple) in Ban Boo Yai
วัดมงคลพุทธาราม in Ban Wangsan
Wat Wangsan (Thai:  วัดวังสาร) in Ban Wangsan
Wat Luang (Thai:  วัดหลวง) in Ban Bang Phi
Wat Thung Noi (Thai:  วัดทุ่งน้อย) in Ban Tung Noi
Wat Nern Sa'at (Thai:  วัดเนินสะอาด) in Ban Nern Sa'at

Notes

References

Tambon of Phitsanulok province
Populated places in Phitsanulok province